The Isaac Conger House is a historic house in Fayetteville, Tennessee. It was built in 1808 for the Conger family. It is listed on the National Register of Historic Places.

History
The house was built in 1808 for Isaac Conger, a settler from North Carolina, and his wife, née Mary Moore. Conger was a Methodist minister, and the couple were cousins. After his death, the house was inherited by his son Sion Conger, who lived here with his wife, née Beall Norton, and their four sons. It was later inherited by one of his sons, Dixie Conger, a mule trader who lived here with his wife, née Mary Shofner, and their five children. By the 1980s, the house still belonger to the Conger family.

Architectural significance
The house was designed in the Federal architectural style. It has been listed on the National Register of Historic Places since July 16, 1973.

References

Houses on the National Register of Historic Places in Tennessee
National Register of Historic Places in Lincoln County, Tennessee
Federal architecture in Tennessee
Houses completed in 1808